Cham law was oral/institutional set of laws of old Cham society and Kingdom of Champa, a Southeast Asian civilization centered around present-day Central Vietnam that had been ceased to exist in 1832. The date and origins of the Cham law are uncertain. 

Remnants of Cham law can be found in the Royal Chronicles of Pāṇḍuraṅga (Sakkarai dak rai patao), which was compiled during the 18th century. The law was implemented and imposed from the upper class, the "above," in contrast to Cham customary law (adac).

References 
 

Legal codes
Champa
Cham